Jumana Emil Abboud is a Palestinian artist living and working in Jerusalem.

She was born in Shefa-'Amr, Galilee and came to Ontario, Canada with her parents in 1979. She began her studies at the Ontario College of Art in Toronto. In 1991, she relocated to Jerusalem where she continued her studies at the Bezalel Academy of Arts and Design, receiving a BFA and a post-graduated diploma.

Abboud has used drawing, video, performance, objects and text in her work which deals with memory, both personal and collective history, loss and resilience. She was a finalist for the Celeste Prize in 2013.

She has had solo exhibitions in Tel Aviv, at the Herzliya Museum of Contemporary Art and at the Forum Schlossplatz in Aarau, Switzerland. Her work has been included in exhibitions at the Venice Biennale, the Istanbul Biennial. the Bahrain National Museum in Manama, the Arab World Institute in Paris, The Jerusalem Show, the Darat al Funun in Amman, at the Carré d'Art in Nîmes. at the Gallery for Contemporary Arts in Leipzig and at the Museo Fundacion Antonio Perez in Cuenca.

Work 
Abboud uses a combination of drawing, video, installation, speech, performance, text and sculpture to portray themes of memory, loss, belonging, and longing. She draws on her own background and Palestinian culture and traditions in her installations. Abboud explores memory and storytelling and oral history through the body and her use of Palestinian folklore and fairy tales. Her art frequently features the Palestinian landscape. She focuses on remembering, the impact of memory fragmentation, and how history impacts one person's current life.

Abboud reinterprets fairytales in her work. She uses the well-known story of Rapunzel to explore the life of Arab women. In this series she uses pencil sketches, photos, lace, and seeds to comment on and depict the woman's normative place in society. She highlights the fact that the image of the domestic woman is relevant in many cultures.

Hide Your Water from the Sun

This three-channel video installation highlights the 1920 study performed by Dr. Tawfiq Canaan about water demons and "haunted" sites in Palestine such as springs. About worked together with Issa Freij, a Palestinian filmmaker, to document the sites. The installation features video of the sites featured in the 1920 study that once contained springs and other water features that have since been lost, but whose locations are part of Palestinian folklore. Along with the video there is audio of Abboud reading text from the study.

Exhibitions 
Group Exhibitions
 ‘El Summoud’, a sight specific artwork at the refugee camp of El Summed, Jerusalem. (1998)
 ‘Palestin(a) - Eight Woman Artists’, Al Wasiti Art Center, Jerusalem. (1998-1999)        
 Mediterranean Biennial for Young Artists, Rome. (1999)                
 'Gateway’, National Gallery of Fine Arts, Amman. (1999)
 ‘Palestinian Artists Today’, Drammens Museum, Norway. (1999)
 Murals in the City, Jericho Winter Festival, Jericho. (1999)
 ‘Look Mama Look’, Art Focus, Jerusalem. (1999)
 The Last Drawing of the Century’, Zerynthia Center for Contemporary Art, Rome. (2000)
 'Empathy’, Galerie im Kornerpark, Berlin. (2000)
 La Havana International Biennial, Havana. (2000)
 'DisOrientation’, House of World Culture, Berlin. (2003)
 'Unscene’, Stephen Lawrence Gallery, London. (2004)
 'Shame’, Holon Center for Digital Art, Holon. (2004)
 'Belonging’, The Seventh International Sharjah Biennial, U.A.E. (2005)
 'Streams of Story’, Tramway, Glasgow International, Glasgow. (2006)
 'Liminal Spaces’, Gallery for Contemporary Arts, Leipzig. (2006)
 'Re-Considering Palestinian Art', The Antonio Pérez Foundation, Cuenca, Spain. (2006)
 'Blindes Vertrauen', Galerie Nord | Kunstverein Tiergarten, Berlin. (2010)

References

Bezalel Academy of Arts and Design alumni
Living people
OCAD University alumni
Palestinian contemporary artists
Palestinian emigrants to Canada
Palestinian women artists
Year of birth missing (living people)